James May's Things You Need to Know is a British television series presented by Top Gear presenter James May. The first, three-part series was aired on BBC Two between 20 June and 4 July 2011. A second, six-part series was aired on BBC Two starting 13 August 2012. The show answers key questions on aspects of everyday life, including what makes up the human body, what a cloud is and what makes the universe work so effectively. The first series has yet to be released on DVD.

Episode list

Series One (2011)

Series Two (2012)

References

External links
 
 

Documentary television series about technology
Things You Need To Know
2011 British television series debuts
BBC television documentaries
2012 British television series endings